The St. Aurelie Maine–St. Aurelie Quebec Border Crossing is a border crossing on the Canada–United States border, located 8 miles east of Saint-Prosper, Quebec. This border crossing exists primarily to accommodate commercial logging operations in the North Maine Woods. The land is commercially owned and the public is generally not permitted to use the logging roads to travel into the United States.

See also
 List of Canada–United States border crossings

References

Canada–United States border crossings
Geography of Estrie
1972 establishments in Maine
1972 establishments in Quebec